The Calgary Flames are a professional ice hockey team based in Calgary, Alberta, Canada. The team is a member of the Pacific Division in the Western Conference of the National Hockey League (NHL). The Flames arrived in Calgary in 1980 after transferring from the city of Atlanta, Georgia, where they were known as the Atlanta Flames from their founding in 1972 until relocation.

Al MacNeil remained the Flames' coach when the franchise transferred to Calgary, serving as the team's first coach in Calgary. "Badger Bob" Johnson, who succeeded MacNeil in 1982, is the Flames' all-time leader in games coached and wins. He was behind the bench when the franchise made its first trip to the Stanley Cup final in 1986. Johnson was elected to the Hockey Hall of Fame in 1992, a year after his death from cancer. Johnson's successor, Terry Crisp, led the Flames to their only Stanley Cup championship in 1989.

The Flames went through several coaches between 1990 and 2003 as the team struggled to find playoff success. Doug Risebrough, Dave King, Pierre Page, Brian Sutter, Don Hay and Greg Gilbert all failed to lead the team past the first round as the Flames endured a 15-year period of playoff futility. Darryl Sutter ended that streak in 2003–04 when he coached the Flames to a marked improvement over their previous season, ending with a trip to the 2004 Stanley Cup Finals. Though he did not win, Sutter earned a nomination for the Jack Adams Award as the league's top coach as a result of the team's performance. Bob Hartley became the head coach in 2012 and won the 2015 Jack Adams Award. He was fired after the 2015-16 season. The current head coach of the Flames is Darryl Sutter.

Key

Coaches
Statistics are correct through the 2019–20 NHL season.

See also
 List of Atlanta Flames head coaches
 List of NHL head coaches

Notes
  A running total of the number of coaches of the Flames. Thus, any coach who had two separate terms as head coach is only counted once.
  Before 1999, overtime losses were included in the loss column; Since 2005, ties are no longer possible.
  Does not include coaching record for the Atlanta Flames.
  Charron served as interim coach for the remainder of the 1991–92 season following Risebrough's resignation.
  MacNeil served as interim head coach during the 2002–03 season following Gilbert's dismissal.
  Ward served as interim head coach during the 2019–20 season following Peters' resignation. Ward also served as head coach for one game, a 3–2 overtime win over the Buffalo Sabres, during the Flames' investigation into alleged misconduct by Peters during his previous coaching tenures. That win is reflected in Peters' totals.

References
General

Specific

 
Calgary Flames
head coaches